Surf clam may refer to:

 Spisula sachalinensis, also known as Sakhalin surf clam, commonly used for sushi (hokkigai)
 Spisula solida, native to the British Isles
 Spisula solidissima, also known as Atlantic surf clam, native to northeastern North America

Animal common name disambiguation pages